Sophia Swire is a British social entrepreneur and impact investor.

Early life
Sophia Swire is the daughter of Humphrey Roger Swire, a director of Sotheby’s, who was a descendant of Sir John Swire, a 19th-century global adventurer, tea trader, and shipping magnate or taipan, and Philippa Sophia, a daughter of Colonel George Jardine Kidston-Montgomerie of Southannan. Her mother married secondly George Townshend, 7th Marquess Townshend. Through her mother she is descended from William the Conqueror, Mary, Queen of Scots and Oliver Cromwell. She has three brothers, including Mark, Philip and Hugo Swire, Baron Swire, a former Minister of State at the Foreign and Commonwealth Office.

She grew up in Scotland, Spain and Dorset, and was educated at Croft House School, Shillingstone, and then at Queen's Gate School in London, and at the University of Manchester, where she graduated in 1986 with a bachelor's degree with honours in history of art with Italian

Career
In the late 1980s, Swire worked in the City of London in equity analysis and for Kleinwort Bensonin institutional equity sales, but she traded that career for life as a trailblazer in social impact. Through her first non profit she helped to found and fund over 200 schools for girls in Afghanistan, Pakistan, India and Tibet. And she established a globally successful sustainable fashion business, with a focus on hand made cashmere crafted by Nepalese artisans.

In 1990, she launched the fashion craze for pashmina shawls through her fashion brand, Sophia Swire London, which became the best selling accessories brand in Harrods for over a decade, and launched the international fashion for pashmina shawls, after seeing them worn by actresses at a party of Imran Khan’s in Lahore, then finding a source for the shawls in Nepal.

In 1993, Swire co-founded Learning for Life, an educational charity, acting as a trustee and chairing its board from 1995 to 2000. This has established over 250 schools for girls in rural Afghanistan, Pakistan, and India, an achievement for which she was awarded the 2010 Award for Empowering Women in Pakistan.

In 2008, at the invitation of Rory Stewart and Charles, Prince of Wales's Turquoise Mountain Foundation, she put her fashion business and life in London on hold and returned to Afghanistan to establish a school for jewellers and gem-cutters at Turquoise Mountain.  During the London Fashion Week, she launched the first contemporary Afghan jewellery collection for Turquoise Mountain, with the designer Pippa Small. The first students graduated in 2010.

In 2010, Swire became the senior gemstones advisor to the Afghan Ministry of Mines and Petroleum, with funding from the World Bank. She has campaigned with Global Witness, as part of the Publish What You Pay campaign, to implement a global policy for better governance of the mining sector, promoting transparency and to fight kleptocracy. She was an advisor to the Afghan Chapter of the Extractive Industries Transparency Initiative ('EITI").

In 2012, Swire established Future Brilliance, a women-led, Afghan non-profit organisation offering workplace skills and enterprise development training. She worked to revive the jewellery industry in gemstone-rich areas of the country. The first Future Brilliance project trained 36 Afghan gem-cutting and jewellery artisans in Jaipur, India, and assisted them in forming Afghanistan’s first jewellery co-operative and brand, Aayenda Jewelry. Future Brilliance successfully delivered the first Digital Literacy training project in Afghanistan, in 2013, funded by the Canadian Fund for Local Initiatives (CFLI).

In October 2013, Swire was announced as a Conservative candidate in the European Parliament election of 2014 in South West England and Gibraltar, together with Ashley Fox, Julie Girling, James Cracknell, Georgina Butler, and Melissa Maynard. The names were confirmed when nominations were lodged in April 2014. Swire said during the campaign that her financial background would enable her to get value for money from the European Union for causes in the region and for protecting the United Kingdom as Europe's principal financial centre. She also wished to tackle extremism. As in the rest of the country, the UK Independence Party ran strongly in South West England in 2014, gaining 51,000 more votes than the Conservatives.

In August 2021, following the fall of Kabul to the Taliban, Swire recruited 170 volunteers to a dedicated Future Brilliance Task Force, with whom she raised $500,000 through a GoFundMe campaign and a grant from Nicolas Berggruen’s foundation. Together with her team, often tag teaming with other virtual volunteer groups in what was termed a “Digital Dunkirk”,  she evacuated over 500 vulnerable Afghans to safety, housing and feeding more than 1000 women, children and their families. Among the many prominent women she evacuated, was Sharbat Gula, the famous National Geographic "green-eyed Afghan girl", whom she rescued at the request of Steve and Bonnie McCurry, and evacuated with the support the head of the Italian Secret Service, Elisabetta Belloni. McCurry, who captured the iconic image of Gula in 1984, has since joined the board of Future Brilliance. The extraordinary story of the evacuation and the Future Brilliance safehouse for asylum seekers in Pakistan, where, led by Swire, Afghan women are taught ICT and computer skills, digital literacy and English language - and where Afghan girls and boys are taught maths, science and robotics, was the subject of a major seven page feature in the UK’s Sunday Times magazine, published on 31 July 2022.

Swire launched Gender Equity Diversity Investments (GEDI), on the main stage at COP26 in Glasgow in November 2021, with a commitment to aim to raise and deploy over £100m in powerful, female-led, tech businesses with sustainable and profitable solutions for the United Nation's Global Goals. GEDI is a woman-owned, impact investing venture capital firm.

Swire is also a published writer, and has produced arts, current affairs and history documentaries for the BBC, Sky TV and Channel 4. Swire has spoken at a number of high-profile events such as the Women's Forum at G20 in Milan (October 2021) YPO at World Economic Forum in Davos (2020) and various family office conferences. In 2015, she spoke at the United Nations in New York for Women’s Entrepreneurship Day. On behalf of Global Witness, she was a contributor to the first Natural Resource Charter.

References

1963 births
British businesspeople
Conservative Party (UK) politicians
Living people
Swire family
People educated at Queen's Gate School